Paysandisia archon is a moth of the family Castniidae. It is native to Uruguay and central Argentina and has been accidentally introduced to Europe, where it is spreading rapidly. It is considered the only member of the genus Paysandisia.

German naturalist Hermann Burmeister described the species in 1879 as Castnia archon.

This is a very large moth with a wingspan of 90–110 mm. The forewings are dark green with brown streaking, the hindwings are bright red with bold black and white markings. The females, generally larger than the males, are easily recognized by the prominent ovipositor. Like other castniids, this species flies by day and has clubbed antennae and is easily mistaken for a butterfly. The adults fly from June to September.

The larva is whitish and maggot-like and feeds in the stems and trunks of palms (see list below for recorded food plants). In its natural range, the damage done by the larvae is unobtrusive and the species is not considered a pest but the species is causing increasing concern in Europe because of the sometimes fatal damage being caused to native and exotic palms.  The species pupates in a cocoon incorporating palm fibres within the larval gallery.

Invasive species
Since arriving in the Southern France in the mid-1990s (probably in mature specimens of Trithrinax from Argentina), it has spread along the Mediterranean coast to parts of Spain, Italy, Greece and Cyprus and it is feared that without effective control, it could spread to areas where palms grow throughout the region. (It is absent from Albania but global warming may make it suitable habitat in 2020–2039.)

One has also been reported from England, in West Sussex in 2002 and 2009 in Northern Ireland. Both UK introductions were eradicated. A survey shows it is absent from the Netherlands. The species was first reported on Russia's Black Sea coast in 2014, and by 2016 had been implicated in the death of over 200 palm trees in Sochi.

Recorded food plants

Natural range
Trithrinax campestris

Introduced range
Chamaerops
Livistona spp., including:
L. chinensis
L. decipiens
L. saribus
Phoenix spp., including:
P. canariensis
P. dactylifera
P. reclinata
Sabal
Trachycarpus fortunei
Washingtonia spp., including:
W. filifera

Gallery

Notes

References
Palm Threat in France? (Inra)
EPPO Quarantine Alert: Paysandisia archon
https://web.archive.org/web/20180408043255/http://www.lepido-france.fr/pdf/BLP_n_22_merit_paysandisia_archon.pdf
Blog Paysendisia Archon - Barrenador palmeras

External links

Fauna Europaea
Lepiforum.de

Castniidae
Insect pests of ornamental plants
Moths described in 1880
Moths of Europe
Taxa named by Hermann Burmeister